New Cemetery may refer to:
 New Cemetery, Belgrade, Serbia
 New Cemetery, Galway, Ireland